Shuragat (Kaitag: Шурагъа; Dargwa: Шурагъат) is a rural locality (a selo) in Kirtsiksky Selsoviet, Kaytagsky District, Republic of Dagestan, Russia. The population was 71 as of 2010.

Geography 
Shuragat is located 26 km south of Madzhalis (the district's administrative centre) by road. Varsit and Kirtsik are the nearest rural localities.

Nationalities 
Dargins live there.

References 

Rural localities in Kaytagsky District